The 2013 Western Australian state election was held on Saturday 9 March 2013 to elect 59 members to the Legislative Assembly and 36 members to the Legislative Council. The Liberal Party won a majority of seats in the Legislative Assembly for the first time since the election of 1996, retaining government with 31 seats. The Labor Party won 21 seats and the National Party won 7 seats. In the Legislative Council, the Liberals won 17 of the 36 seats.

Results

Legislative Assembly

|}

Legislative Council

|}

Summary of Assembly results

Seats changing parties

 Members listed in italics did not contest their seat at this election.
 * figure is vs. Liberal
 ** figure is vs. Labor
 *** figure is vs. National

Background
At previous elections, the government was able to choose the date of an election, but on 3 November 2011, the government introduced fixed four-year terms, with elections being held every four years on the second Saturday in March. This was the first election under the new system.

Key dates
 Issue of writ: 6 February
 Nominations open: 7 February
 Close of party nominations: 12 noon, 14 February
 Close of rolls: 6 pm, 14 February
 Close of independent nominations: 12 noon, 15 February
 Postal voting commences: ?
 Pre-poll voting commences: 20 February
 Polling day: 9 March
 Return of writ: On or before 6 May

Seats held

Lower house
At the 2008 election, Labor won 28 seats, the Liberals won 24 seats, the Nationals won four seats, with three seats won by independents. Three changes have occurred since; the Greens won the seat of Fremantle off Labor at the 2009 by-election, Vince Catania in the seat of North West defected from Labor to the Nationals in July 2009, and Fremantle MP Adele Carles resigned from the Greens in 2010, leaving Labor with 26 seats, the Liberals with 24 seats, the Nationals with five seats, while independents hold four seats.

Boundary changes took effect at this election. The only changes to the notional 2008 results were that the seat of Morley shifted from Liberal to Labor and the seat of North West (renamed North West Central) shifted from Labor to National.

Upper house
At the 2008 election, the Liberals won 16 seats, Labor won 11 seats, the Nationals won five seats, and the Greens won four seats.

Retiring MPs

Labor

 John Kobelke MLA (Balcatta)
 Carol Martin MLA (Kimberley)
 Eric Ripper MLA (Belmont)
 Tom Stephens MLA (Pilbara)
 Martin Whitely MLA (Bassendean)
 Helen Bullock MLC (Mining and Pastoral Region)
 Ed Dermer MLC (North Metropolitan Region)
 Jon Ford MLC (Mining and Pastoral Region)
 Linda Savage MLC (East Metropolitan Region)

Liberal

 Norman Moore MLC (Mining and Pastoral Region)

National

 Grant Woodhams MLA (Moore)

Independent

 John Bowler MLA (Kalgoorlie)
 Liz Constable MLA (Churchlands)

2008 pendulum
The following Mackerras pendulum works by lining up all of the seats according to the percentage point margin post-election on a two-candidate-preferred basis.

1.Elected as Labor member, defected to the Nationals in July 2009, margin is ALP v NAT.
2.Elected as Green member, resigned from The Greens in May 2010.

Polling
Newspoll polling is conducted via random telephone number selection in city and country areas. Sampling sizes consist of around 1,100 electors. The declared margin of error is ±3 percent.

Newspaper endorsements

See also
 Candidates of the 2013 Western Australian state election

References

External links
 2013 Western Australian Election Preview: Antony Green ABC
 Western Australian Electoral Commission
 Antony Green's Election Blog - Western Australia Elections and Politics

Elections in Western Australia
2013 elections in Australia
2010s in Western Australia
March 2013 events in Australia